Upjohn's Triangle was a short-lived educational series of animations produced in the late 1960s and again in the late 1970s by The Walt Disney Company's educational media division and sponsored by the Upjohn pharmaceutical company. This series focused on health. This series is similar to the What Should I Do? series.

Films

1968
Understanding Stress and Strain  
Steps Toward Maturity and Health

1969
The Social Side of Health  
Physical Fitness and Good Health

1979
Understanding Alcohol Use and Abuse

1992 
Note: The following episodes were live-action only.
Keeping the Balance
Moving On
Personal Challenge
True Friends

See also
List of Disney animated shorts

References

External links

Disney direct-to-video animated films
Disney educational films
Disney short film series
Direct-to-video film series
Sponsored films
1968 films
1960s educational films
1970s educational films
1960s American films
1970s American films